The Kyūseki Teien, also known as the  is a Japanese garden dating to the Nara period, located in Nara, Nara, western Japan.

The garden and pavilions date to the same period of the Heijō Palace. The remains were excavated in the 1970s and restored.

References

External links 

 https://narashikanko.or.jp/en/spot/park/heijokyosakyo/
 Images
 Images

Buildings and structures in Nara, Nara
History of Nara Prefecture
Nara period
Tourist attractions in Nara Prefecture